Metatron, or Mattatron, is an angel in Judaism mentioned three times in the Talmud, in a few brief passages in the Aggadah, and in mystical Kabbalistic texts within Rabbinic literature. The figure forms one of the traces for the presence of dualist proclivities in the otherwise monotheistic visions of both the Tanakh and later Christian doctrine. The name Metatron is not mentioned in the Torah or the Bible and how the name originated is a matter of debate. In Islamic tradition, he is also known as Mīṭaṭrūn, the angel of the veil. In folkloristic tradition, he is the highest of the angels and serves as the celestial scribe or "recording angel".

In Jewish apocrypha and early Kabbalah, 'Metatron' is the name that Enoch received after his transformation into an angel.

Etymology 
Numerous etymologies have been proposed to account for the name Metatron, but there is no consensus, and its precise origin is unknown.

Hugo Odeberg, Adolf Jellinek and Marcus Jastrow suggest the name may have originated from either  or the verb  ('to guard' or 'to protect'). Odeberg also suggested that the name Metatron might have been adopted from the Old Persian name Mithra. Citing Wiesner, he drew up a number of parallels that appeared to link Mithra and Metatron based on their positions in heaven and duties.

The primary arguments against this etymology are that Metatron's function as a servant of the celestial throne emerges only later in the traditions regarding him, and  itself is not attested as a word in Talmudic literature.

A connection with the word  used as 'co-occupant of the divine throne', has been advanced by some scholars; This, like the above etymology, is not found in any source materials. It is supported by Saul Lieberman and Peter Schäfer, who give further reasons why this might be a viable etymology. The Latin word  ('messenger, guide, leader, measurer') had been suggested by Eleazar of Worms (–), Nachmanides, and brought to light again by Hugo Odeberg. Philip Alexander also suggests this as a possible origin of Metatron, stating that the word  also occurs in Greek as  – a word for an officer in the Roman army who acted as a forerunner. Using this etymology, Alexander suggests the name may have come about as a description of 'the angel of the Lord who led the Israelites through the wilderness: acting like a Roman army metator guiding the Israelites on their way'.

Other ideas include  ('a measure'). Charles Mopsik believes that the name Metatron may be related to the sentence from Genesis 5:24, "Enoch walked with God, then he was no more, because God took him."

In the entry entitled "Paradigmata" in his study, "'The Written' as the Vocation of Conceiving Jewishly", John W. McGinley gives an accounting of how this name functions in the Bavli's version of "four entered pardes".

Origins 
From Hellenistic times, mention of a second divine figure, either beside YHWH or beneath him, occur in a number of Jewish texts, mostly apocryphal. These Jewish traditions implying a divine dualism were most frequently associated with Enoch. In the rabbinic period they centre on 'Metatron', often in the context of debates over the heretical doctrine of 'two powers in heaven'. Ultimately these ideas appear to go back to differing interpretations of the heavenly enthronement passages at Exodus 24:10f., Daniel 7:9f. and perhaps even Ezekiel 1:26f. These different interpretations later came to distinguish what was orthodox from what was heretical in Judaism.

Among the pseudepigrapha 1 Enoch: Book of Parables presents two figures: the son of man and Enoch. At first, these two characters seem to be separate entities. Enoch views the son of man enthroned in Heaven. Later, however, they prove to be one and the same. Many scholars believe that the final chapters in the Book of Parables are a later addition. Others think they are not and that the son of man is Enoch's heavenly double similarly to the Prayer of Joseph where Jacob is depicted as an angel. The Book of Daniel displays two similar characters: the Ancient of Days and the one like a man. Parts of the text in Daniel are Aramaic and may have been changed in translation. The Septuagint reads that the son of man came as the Ancient of Days. All other translations say the son of man gained access to the Ancient of Days and was brought before that one.

The identification of Metatron with the gnostic 3 Enoch, where the name first appears, is not explicitly made in the Talmud although it does refer to a Prince of the World who was young but now is old. However, some of the earliest kabbalists assumed the connection. There also seems to be two Metatrons, one spelled with six letters, and one spelled with seven. The former may be the transformed Enoch, Prince of the Countenance within the divine palace; the latter, the Primordial Metatron, an emanation of the "Cause of Causes", specifically the tenth and last emanation, identified with the earthly Divine Presence. Furthermore, the Merkabah text  identifies the Ancient of Days from the Book of Daniel as Metatron.

Scholem's scholastic analysis
Many scholars see a discontinuity between how Enoch is portrayed in the early Enoch literature and how Metatron is portrayed. Scholars commonly see the character of Metatron as being based on an amalgam of Jewish literature, in addition to Enoch, Michael, Melchizedek, and Yahoel among others are seen as influences.

Gershom Scholem argues Metatron's character was influenced by two streams of thought. One of which linked Metatron with Enoch, while the second was a fusing of different obscure entities and mythic motifs. Scholem argues that this second tradition was originally separate but later became fused with the Enoch tradition. He points to texts where this second Metatron is a primordial angel and referred to as Metatron Rabbah. Scholem theorizes that the two Hebrew spellings of Metatron's name are representative of these two separate traditions. In his view, the second Metatron is linked to Yahoel. Scholem also links Yahoel with Michael. In the Apocalypse of Abraham Yahoel is assigned duties normally reserved for Michael. Yahoel's name is commonly seen as a substitute for the Ineffable Name.

In 2 Enoch, Enoch is assigned titles commonly used by Metatron such as "the Youth, the Prince of the Presence and the Prince of the World." However, Enoch is not referred to as the Lesser YHWH. In 3 Enoch, Metatron is called the Lesser YHWH. This raises a problem since the name Metatron does not seem to be directly related to the name of God YHWH. Scholem proposes that this is because the Lesser YHWH is a reference to Yahoel. In Maaseh Merkabah the text reasons that Metatron is called the Lesser YHWH because in Hebrew gematria Metatron is numerically equivalent to another name of God . Scholem does not find this convincing. Scholem points to the fact that both Yahoel and Metatron were known as the Lesser YHWH. In 3 Enoch 48D1 Metatron is called both Yahoel Yah and Yahoel. In addition to being one of the seventy names of Metatron from 3 Enoch 48D, Yahoel and Metatron are also linked in Aramaic incantation bowl inscriptions.

Talmud 
The Babylonian Talmud mentions Metatron by name in three places: Hagigah 15a, Sanhedrin 38b and Avodah Zarah 3b.

Hagigah 15a describes Elisha ben Abuyah in Paradise seeing Metatron sitting down (an action that is not done in the presence of God). Elishah ben Abuyah therefore looks to Metatron as a deity and says heretically: "Perhaps there are, God forbid, two powers in Heaven!" The rabbis explain that Metatron had permission to sit because of his function as the Heavenly Scribe, writing down the deeds of Israel. The Talmud states that it was proved to Elisha that Metatron could not be a second deity by the fact that Metatron received 60 "strokes with fiery rods" to demonstrate that Metatron was not a god, but an angel, and could be punished.

In Sanhedrin 38b one of the  tells Rabbi Idith that Metatron should be worshiped because he has a name like his master. Rabbi Idith uses the same passage Exodus 23:21 to show that Metatron was an angel and not a deity and thus should not be worshiped. Furthermore, as an angel, Metatron has no power to pardon transgressions nor was he to be received even as a messenger of forgiveness.

In Avodah Zarah 3b, the Talmud hypothesizes as to how God spends his day. It is suggested that in the fourth quarter of the day God sits and instructs the school children, while in the preceding three quarters Metatron may take God's place or God may do this among other tasks.

Yevamot 16b records an utterance, "I have been young; also I have been old" found in Psalm 37:25. The Talmud here attributes this utterance to the Chief Angel and Prince of the World, whom the rabbinic tradition identifies as Metatron.

Kirkisani 
The tenth century Karaite scholar Jacob Qirqisani believed that rabbinic Judaism was the heresy of Jeroboam of the Kingdom of Israel. He quoted a version of Sanhedrin 38b, which he claimed contained a reference to the "lesser YHVH". Gershom Scholem suggests that the name was deliberately omitted from later copies of the Talmud. Extra-talmudic mystical texts such as Sefer Hekhalot do speak of a "lesser YHWH", apparently deriving the concept from Exodus 23:21, which mentions an angel of whom God says "my name [understood as YHVH, the usual divine Proper Name] is in him".

Merkabah, Zohar and other mystical writings 
Metatron also appears in the Pseudepigrapha including , and most prominently in the Hebrew Merkabah Book of Enoch, also called 3 Enoch or Sefer Hekhalot (Book of [the Heavenly] Palaces). The book describes the link between Enoch, son of Jared (great-grandfather of Noah) and his transformation into the angel Metatron. His grand title "the lesser YHVH" resurfaces here.

Metatron says, "He [the Holy One][...] called me, 'The lesser YHVH' in the presence of his whole household in the height, as it is written, 'my name is in him.'" (12:5, Alexander's translation.) The narrator of this book, supposedly Rabbi Ishmael, tells how Metatron guided him through Heaven and explained its wonders. 3 Enoch presents Metatron in two ways: as a primordial angel (9:2–13:2) and as the transformation of Enoch after he was assumed into Heaven.

Metatron "the Youth", a title previously used in 3 Enoch, where it appears to mean "servant". It identifies him as the angel that led the people of Israel through the wilderness after their exodus from Egypt (again referring to Exodus 23:21), and describes him as a heavenly priest.

In the later Ecstatic Kabbalah, Metatron is a messianic figure.

The Zohar describes Metatron as the "King of the angels." and associates the concept of Metatron with that of the divine name .

The Zohar describes several biblical figures as metaphors for Metatron. Examples are Enoch, Joseph, Eliezer, Joshua, and others. The Zohar finds the word youth used to describe Joseph and Joshua a hint that the figures are a metaphor to Metatron, and also the concept of servant by Eliezer as a reference to Metatron. The Staff of Moses is also described by the Zohar as a reference to Metatron. The Zohar draws distinction between Metatron and Michael. While Michael is described repeatedly in the Zohar as the figure represented by the High Priest, Metatron is represented by the structure of the tabernacle itself.

Apocalyptic texts 
In the Apocalypse of Zerubbabel Metatron is not identified as Enoch. Instead he is identified as the archangel Michael. While he also appears in other apocalyptic writings he is most prominent in the Apocalypse of Zerubbabel. In these writings he plays the role of heavenly interlocutor delivering knowledge about the coming messianic age.

Islam 

The earliest account of Metatron within Islamic scriptures might derive directly from the Quran itself. Uzair, according to Surah 9:30-31 venerated as a Son of God by Jews, is another name for the prophet Ezra, who was also identified with Metatron in Merkabah Mysticism. Islamic heresiologists repeatedly accused Jews for venerating an angel as a lesser god (or an Incarnation of God), especially for celebrating Rosh Hashanah. The name itself is attested early in Islam by Al-Kindi and Al-Masudi. In a Druze text about cosmology, he is mentioned among the canonical Archangels in Islamic traditions. Al-Suyuti identifies him as the angel of the veil and only he knows about that which lies beyond. He is also frequently mentioned in the magical works by Ahmad al-Buni, who describes Metatron as wearing a crown and a lance, probably constituting the Staff of Moses. In other magical practises, he is invoked to ward off evil jinn, devils, sorcerers and other magical threats.

Ibn Hazm mentions that Jews, although regarding Metatron as an angel, would celebrate Metatron as a lesser god 10 days each year, probably a reference to Rosh Hashanah in connection with Merkabah mysticism that Metatron took part on the creation of the world.

See also 
 Jesus
 Maitreya in Buddhism
 Adam Kadmon
 Sandalphon
 Theophany
 Ezra
 Yufin-Yufafin in Mandaeism
 Abatur in Mandaeism
 List of angels in theology

Notes

References

External links 

 G. G. Stroumsa, "Form(s) of God: Some Notes on Metatron and Christ", Harvard Theological Review 76 (1983), 269–288
 Excerpts about Metatron from books by Andrei A. Orlov:
 The Etymology of the Name "Metatron"
 Metatron as the Deity: Lesser YHWH
 Metatron as the Mediator
 Metatron as the Prince of the World
 Metatron as God's Shiur Qomah
 Metatron as the Youth
 Metatron as the Expert in Secrets
 Metatron as the Scribe
 Daniel Abrams, "The Boundaries of Divine Ontology: The Inclusion and Exclusion of Metatron in the Godhead" Harvard Theological Review, vol. 87(1994)

Individual angels
People celebrated in the Lutheran liturgical calendar
Scribes
Archangels
Angels of the Presence
Archangel in Judaism
Archangels in Islam